Laccophilus pictus is a species of predaceous diving beetle in the family Dytiscidae. It is found in the Neotropics.

Subspecies
These three subspecies belong to the species Laccophilus pictus:
 Laccophilus pictus coccinelloides Régimbart, 1889
 Laccophilus pictus insignis Sharp, 1882
 Laccophilus pictus pictus Laporte, 1835

References

Further reading

 
 

Dytiscidae
Articles created by Qbugbot
Beetles described in 1835